Campiglia dei Berici is a town in the province of Vicenza, Veneto, Italy. It is west of SP247 provincial road. It originated in the Middle Ages around a castle, destroyed in the 1310s. Sights include a parish church (13th century, rebuilt in 1679) and Villa Repeta-Mocenigo-Bressan, built in 1672 above the ruins of a villa by Andrea Palladio.

Sources
(Google Maps)

References

Cities and towns in Veneto